As Dreams Are Made On is a 2004 short film written and directed by Gabriel Reid.

Ian Hughes plays Reuben Mills, a young actor feeling pressure to nest. With his company about to tour he finds himself at an emotional crossroads. The time has come to choose his path.

Gabriel Reid was inspired to undertake this project after researching his M.A. thesis examining film adaptations of Shakespeare. At the University of Auckland, his thesis was supervised by Professor MacDonald P. Jackson. Reid's research interviewees included John Barton, Hugh Cruttwell, Adrian Noble, Trevor Nunn, David Parfitt and Imogen Stubbs.

The film's title is derived from lines uttered by the magician Prospero, in Act IV, Scene I, of Shakespeare's late romance The Tempest:

Festivals
 Rhode Island International Film Festival
 Drifting Clouds Film Festival
 Melbourne International Film Festival
 New Zealand International Film Festival

External links
 
 As Dreams Are Made On at the New Zealand Film Commission

References

2004 films
New Zealand independent films
2004 drama films
2000s English-language films